The Embassy of Saudi Arabia in London (officially the Royal Embassy of Saudi Arabia) is the diplomatic mission of Saudi Arabia in the United Kingdom. Saudi Arabia also maintains a Defence Attaché's Office at 26 Queen's Gate, South Kensington, a Diplomatic Office of the Cultural Bureau at 630 Chiswick High Road, Gunnersbury, a Medical Section at 60 Queen Anne Street, Marylebone, a Commercial Section at 15/16 Queen Street, Mayfair, an Islamic Affairs Section at 2nd Floor, Park Lorne, 111 Park Road, Lisson Grove and an Information Section at 18 Seymour Street, Marylebone.

The embassy is situated in Crewe House, a detached mansion designed and constructed by Edward Shepherd in 1730, set in its own grounds in Mayfair. Built in the Georgian style, it is a Grade II* listed building. The house was considerably altered in the late 18th and early 19th-century. Much of its neo-classical interior dates from the early 19th-century, and some of Shepherd's original plasterwork ceilings may survive.

Gallery

See also

 Saudi Arabia–United Kingdom relations

References

External links
 Official site

Houses completed in 1730
Saudi Arabia
Diplomatic missions of Saudi Arabia
Saudi Arabia
Georgian architecture in the City of Westminster
Grade II* listed buildings in the City of Westminster
Grade II* listed houses in London
Houses in the City of Westminster
Saudi Arabia–United Kingdom relations